The 1957 Glover Trophy was a motor race, run to Formula One rules, held on 22 April 1957 at Goodwood Circuit, England. The race was run over 42 laps of the circuit, and was won by British driver Stuart Lewis-Evans in a Connaught B Type.

The Team Lotus and Cooper Car Company works entries were Formula Two cars.

Classification

The Cooper Car Company had entered a second Formula Two Cooper (#11), but no driver was allocated and the car did not arrive.

References

 Results at www.silhouet.com 

Glover Trophy
Glover Trophy
20th century in West Sussex
Glover
Glover Trophy